Leptorhamdia is a genus of three-barbeled catfishes native to tropical South America.

Species
There are currently three recognized species in this genus:
 Leptorhamdia essequibensis (C. H. Eigenmann, 1912)
 Leptorhamdia marmorata G. S. Myers, 1928
 Leptorhamdia schultzi (P. Miranda-Ribeiro, 1964)

References

Heptapteridae
Fish of South America
Catfish genera
Taxa named by Carl H. Eigenmann
Freshwater fish genera